Gunnar Wilhelm Harling (7 June 1920, in Stockholm – 24 May 2010) was a Swedish botanist.

Harling did his doctorate at the University of Stockholm in 1951, was an assistant at the Bergius Botanic Garden from 1950 to 1952 and associate professor of botany at the University of Stockholm 1951–1963. From 1964 he was professor of botany at the University of Gothenburg, and in 1974 became a member of the Academy of Sciences.

References

1920 births
2010 deaths
Swedish botanists
Members of the Royal Swedish Academy of Sciences